The women's bantamweight (−55 kilograms) event at the 2006 Asian Games took place on 9 December 2006 at Qatar SC Indoor Hall, Doha, Qatar.

A total of twelve competitors from twelve countries competed in this event, limited to fighters whose body weight was less than 55 kilograms. 

Kim Bo-hye from South Korea won the gold medal after beating Hoàng Hà Giang of Vietnam in gold medal match 2–0 after three rounds, The bronze medal was shared by Kazakh Saule Sardarova and Cosette Basbous of Lebanon, they both lost in the semifinal round to Kim Bo-hye and Hoàng Hà Giang.

Athletes from Uzbekistan, Qatar, Iran and Tajikistan shared the fifth place after losing in the quarterfinal round.

Schedule
All times are Arabia Standard Time (UTC+03:00)

Results

References
Results

External links
Official website

Taekwondo at the 2006 Asian Games